Out of the Shadow is a grassroots documentary film by Susan Smiley concerning her mother, Mildred Smiley. Mildred Smiley is a middle-aged woman who has battled schizophrenia for over twenty years. The documentary chronicles her journey from psychiatric wards, nursing and group homes in Illinois, United States.

Out of the Shadow is composed of interview footage interspersed with home movies and photographs.

The film has been positively reviewed by mental health journals such as Clinical Psychiatry News and the Journal of Medical Humanities.

References

External links
 
 

American documentary television films
2004 films
2004 documentary films
Documentary films about schizophrenia
Documentary films about women
Films shot in Illinois
2000s American films